Irving John "Stub" Barron (November 11, 1890 – August 18, 1979) was an American football and basketball coach. He served as the head football coach at the Colorado School of Mines in Golden, Colorado in 1918, compiling a record of 4–0. Barron was also the head basketball coach at Colorado Mines in 1918–19, tallying a mark of 2–6.

Barron was born on November 11, 1890, in Gordon, Nebraska.  He played college football at the University of Iowa from 1913 to 1915, captaining the 1915 Iowa Hawkeyes football team.  Barron also earned letters at Iowa in track and field and wrestling.  He died on August 18, 1979, at Mercy Hospital in Iowa City, Iowa.

Head coaching record

Football

References

External links
 Sports-Reference profile

1890 births
1979 deaths
Basketball coaches from Iowa
Colorado Mines Orediggers football coaches
Colorado Mines Orediggers men's basketball coaches
Iowa Hawkeyes football coaches
Iowa Hawkeyes football players
Iowa Hawkeyes men's track and field athletes
Iowa Hawkeyes wrestlers
People from Gordon, Nebraska
People from Woodbury County, Iowa
Players of American football from Iowa
Track and field athletes from Iowa